Highway 118 is a divided highway connecting Dartmouth with Highway 102 at Fall River,  to the north in the Canadian province of Nova Scotia. 

The highway crosses the historic Shubenacadie Canal and also runs along the western shore of Lake Micmac and the western edge of Shubie Park and is known as Lakeview Drive. Running parallel to the highway from the Waverley Road to exit 14 is a portion of the Halifax Lateral of the Maritimes & Northeast Pipeline (natural gas).

The southern limit of provincial maintenance is at the Highway 111 interchange.

History
Originally an undivided highway, the road opened in 1971. The southbound carriageway between Highway 102 and Dartmouth was completed during the 1979/80 fiscal year.

The interchange with Highway 107 opened in 1986/87. Originally there was no connection to Akerley Boulevard, one of the main roads in Burnside Industrial Park. During planning and construction of the interchange, the Industrial Commission and the former City of Dartmouth lobbied the province to make provision for a connection between Akerley Boulevard and Highway 118. The Akerley Boulevard access was constructed in the early 1990s.

In the early 2000s, development of the Dartmouth Crossing commercial area next to Highway 118 led to construction of the Wright Avenue interchange. The interchange was built by contractor Dexter Construction and includes a pedestrian bridge to permit access to Shubie Park.

Exit list

 Exit 1 was used from 1971 to 2007 and renumbered Exit 11
 Exits 2 and 3 used to be a work site until construction started on Dartmouth Crossing in 2005
 Exit 4 was used until 1979, when it was renumbered to Exit 13
 Exit 5 was also used until 1979, when it was renumbered to Exit 14

References

Nova Scotia provincial highways
Roads in Halifax, Nova Scotia
Limited-access roads in Canada
1971 establishments in Nova Scotia